Islam is the second-largest religion in Europe after Christianity. Although the majority of Muslim communities in Western Europe formed recently, there are centuries-old Muslim societies in the Balkans, Caucasus, Crimea, and Volga region. The term "Muslim Europe" is used to refer to the Muslim-majority countries in the Balkans (Bosnia and Herzegovina, Albania, and Kosovo) and parts of countries in Eastern Europe with sizable Muslim minorities (Bulgaria, Montenegro, North Macedonia, and some republics of Russia) that constitute large populations of native European Muslims, although the majority are secular.

Islam expanded into the Caucasus through the Muslim conquest of Persia in the 7th century and entered Southern Europe through the expansion after the Umayyad conquest of Hispania in the 8th–10th centuries; Muslim political entities existed firmly in what is today Spain, Portugal, Sicily, and Malta during the Middle Ages. The Muslim populations in these territories were either converted to Christianity or expelled by the end of the 15th century by the Christian rulers (see Reconquista). The Ottoman Empire further expanded into Southeastern Europe and consolidated its political power by invading and conquering huge portions of the Serbian Empire, Bulgarian Empire, and all the remaining territories of the Byzantine Empire in the 14th and 15th centuries. Over the centuries, the Ottoman Empire gradually lost almost all of its European territories, until it was defeated and eventually collapsed in 1922. Islam spread in Eastern Europe via the conversion of the Volga Bulgars, Cuman-Kipchaks, and later the Golden Horde and its successor khanates, with its various Muslim populations called "Tatars" by the Russians. Historically significant Muslim populations in Europe include the Gorani, Torbeshi, Pomaks, Bosniaks, Muslim Albanians, Cham Albanians, Greek Muslims, Vallahades, Muslim Romani people, Balkan Turks, Turkish Cypriots, Cretan Turks, Yörüks, Volga Tatars, Crimean Tatars, Kazakhs, Gajals, and Megleno-Romanians.

In the late 20th and early 21st centuries, large numbers of Muslims immigrated to Western Europe. By 2010, an estimated 44 million Muslims were living in Europe (6%), including an estimated 19 million in the EU (3.8%). They are projected to compose 8% or 58 million by 2030. They are often the subject of intense discussion and political controversies sparked by events such as Islamic terrorist attacks in European countries, The Satanic Verses controversy, the cartoons affair in Denmark, debates over Islamic dress, and growing support for right-wing populist movements and parties that view Muslims as a threat to European culture and liberal values. Such events have also fueled ongoing debates regarding the topics of globalization, multiculturalism, Islamophobia, attitudes toward Muslims, and the populist right.

History
The Muslim population in Europe is extremely diverse with varied histories and origins. Today, the Muslim-majority regions of Europe are the Balkans (Albania, Bosnia and Herzegovina, Kosovo, and European Turkey), some Russian republics in the North Caucasus and the Idel-Ural region, and the European part of Kazakhstan. These communities consist predominantly of indigenous Europeans of the Muslim faith, whose religious tradition dates back several hundred years to the Middle Ages. The transcontinental countries of Turkey, Azerbaijan, and Kazakhstan are also majority Muslim.

Western Europe and the Mediterranean Region

Arab Muslim forays into Europe began shortly after the foundation of Islam in the 7th century CE. Soon after the death of Muhammad in 632 CE, his community needed to appoint a new leader, giving rise to the title of caliph, which was claimed by some of Muhammad's closest companions (ṣaḥāba) and their descendants over the succession for the role of caliph throughout the centuries. The four "rightly-guided" (rāshidūn) caliphs who succeeded him oversaw the initial phase of the early Muslim conquests, advancing through Persia, the Levant, Egypt, and North Africa.

The early Muslim conquests expanded westwards, and within less than a century encompassed parts of the European continent. Arab Muslim forces easily prevailed over the Byzantine army in the crucial battles of Ajnâdayn (634 CE) and Yarmûk (636 CE), and incorporated the former Byzantine province of Syria, pushing to the north and west. At the same time, consolidation of the hold of Islam by the Arab empires in North Africa and the Middle East was soon to be followed by incursions into what is now Europe, as Arab and Berber Muslim armies raided and eventually conquered territories leading to the establishment of Muslim-ruled states on the European continent.

A short-lived invasion of Byzantine Sicily by a small Arab and Berber contingent that landed in 652 was the prelude of a series of incursions; from the 8th to the 15th centuries, Muslim states ruled parts of the Iberian Peninsula, southern Italy, southern France, and several Mediterranean islands, while in the East, incursions into a much reduced in territory and weakened Byzantine Empire continued. In the 720s and 730s, Arab and Berber Muslim forces fought and raided north of the Pyrenees, well into what is now France, reaching as north as Tours, where they were eventually defeated and repelled by the Christian Franks in 732 to their Iberian and North African territories.

Islam gained its first genuine foothold in continental Europe from 711 onward, with the Umayyad conquest of Hispania. The Arabs renamed the land al-Andalus, which expanded to include the larger parts of what is now Portugal and Spain, excluding the northern highlands. Arab and Berber Muslim forces established various emirates in Europe after the invasion of southern Iberia and the foundation of al-Andalus. One notable emirate was the Emirate of Crete, a Muslim-ruled state and center of Muslim piratical activity that existed on the Mediterranean island of Crete from the late 820s until the Byzantine reconquest of the island in 961, when the Byzantine Emperor Nikephoros II Phokas defeated and expelled the Muslim Arabs and Berbers from Crete for the Byzantine Empire, and made the island into a theme. The other was the Emirate of Sicily, which existed on the eponymous island from 831 to 1091; Muslim Arabs and Berbers held onto Sicily and other regions of southern Italy until they were eventually defeated and expelled by the Christian Normans in 1072 to their Iberian and North African territories.

The presence of a Muslim majority in North Africa and the Iberian Peninsula by the foundation of al-Andalus and other Muslim-ruled states in the Mediterranean Region between the 7th and 10th centuries CE is debated among scholars and historians; one author claims that al-Andalus had a Muslim majority after most of the local population allegedly converted to Islam on their own will, whereas other historians remark how the Umayyad Caliphate persecuted many Berber Christians in the 7th and 8th centuries CE, who slowly converted to Islam. Modern historians further recognize that the Christian populations living in the lands invaded by the Arab Muslim armies between the 7th and 10th centuries CE suffered religious persecution, religious violence, and martyrdom multiple times at the hands of Arab Muslim officials and rulers; many were executed under the Islamic death penalty for defending their Christian faith through dramatic acts of resistance such as refusing to convert to Islam, repudiation of the Islamic religion and subsequent reconversion to Christianity, and blasphemy towards Muslim beliefs. The martyrdom of forty-eight Iberian Christians that took place under the rule of Abd al-Rahman II and Muhammad I in the Emirate of Córdoba (between 850 and 859 CE) has been recorded in historical documents and treatises of the time.

This coincided with the La Convivencia period of the Iberian Peninsula as well as the Golden age of Jewish culture in Spain. In Francia, the Arab and Berber Muslim forces invaded the region of Septimania in 719 and deposed the local Visigothic Kingdom in 720; after the Frankish conquest of Narbonne in 759, the Muslim Arabs and Berbers were defeated by the Christian Franks and retreated to their Andalusian heartland after 40 years of occupation, and the Carolingian king Pepin the Short came up reinforced. The Iberian Christian counter-offensive known as the Reconquista began in the early 8th century, when Muslim forces managed to temporarily push into Aquitaine. Slowly, the Christian forces began a re-conquest of the fractured Taifa kingdoms in al-Andalus. There was still a Muslim presence north of Spain, especially in Fraxinet all the way into Switzerland until the 10th century. Muslim forces under the Aghlabids conquered Sicily after a series of expeditions spanning 827–902, and had notably raided Rome in 846. By 1236, practically all that remained of Muslim-ruled Iberia was the southern province of Granada.

Since they are considered "People of the Book" in the Islamic religion, Christians and Jews under Muslim rule were subjected to the status of dhimmi (along with Samaritans, Gnostics, Mandeans, and Zoroastrians in the Middle East), which was inferior to the status of Muslims. Arab Muslims imposed the Islamic law (sharīʿa) in these Muslim-ruled countries; thus, the Latin- and Greek-speaking European Christian populations, as well as the Jewish communities of Europe, faced religious discrimination and persecution due to being considered religious minorities; they were further banned from proselytising (for Christians, it was forbidden to evangelize or spread Christianity) in the lands invaded by the Arab Muslims on pain of death, they were banned from bearing arms, undertaking certain professions, and were obligated to dress differently in order to distinguish themselves from Arabs. Under the Islamic law (sharīʿa), Non-Muslims were obligated to pay the jizya and kharaj taxes, together with periodic heavy ransom levied upon Christian communities by Muslim rulers in order to fund military campaigns, all of which contributed a significant proportion of income to the Islamic states while conversely reducing many Christians to poverty, and these financial and social hardships forced many Christians to convert to Islam. Christians unable to pay these taxes were forced to surrender their children to the Muslim rulers as payment who would sell them as slaves to Muslim households where they were forced to convert to Islam.

Cultural impact and interaction

Overthrown by the Abbasids, the deposed Umayyad caliph Abd al-Rahman I fled the city of Damascus in 756 and established an independent Emirate of Córdoba in al-Andalus. His dynasty consolidated the presence of Islam in al-Andalus. By the time of the reign of Abd al-Rahman II (822–852), Córdoba was becoming one of the biggest and most important cities in Europe. Umayyad Spain had become a centre of the Muslim world that rivaled the Muslim cities of Damascus and Baghdad. "The emirs of Córdoba built palaces reflecting the confidence and vitality of Andalusi Islam, minted coins, brought to Spain luxury items from the East, initiated ambitious projects of irrigation and transformed agriculture, reproduced the style and ceremony of the Abbasid court ruling in the East and welcomed famous scholars, poets and musicians from the rest of the Muslim world". But, the most significant impact of the Emirate was its cultural influence over the Non-Muslim local populations. An "elegant Arabic" became the preferred language of the educated—Muslim, Christian, and Jewish, the readership of Arabic books increased rapidly, and Arabic romance and poetry became extremely popular. The popularity of literary Arabic was just one aspect of the Arabization of the Christian and Jewish populations of the Iberian Peninsula, which led contemporaries to refer to the affected populations as "Mozarabs" (mozárabes in Spanish; moçárabes in Portuguese; derived from the Arabic musta’rib, translated as "like Arabs" or "Arabicized")."

Arabic-speaking Iberian Christian scholars preserved and studied influential pre-Christian and pre-Islamic Greco-Roman texts, and introduced aspects of medieval Islamic culture, including the arts, economics, science, and technology. (See also: Latin translations of the 12th century and Islamic contributions to Medieval Europe). Muslim rule endured in the Emirate of Granada, from 1238 as a vassal state of the Christian Kingdom of Castile until the completion of La Reconquista in 1492. The Moriscos (Moorish in Spanish) were finally expelled from Spain between 1609 (Castile) and 1614 (rest of Iberia), by Philip III during the Spanish Inquisition.

Throughout the 16th to 19th centuries, the Barbary States sent pirates to raid nearby parts of Europe in order to capture Christian slaves to sell at slave markets in the Muslim world, primarily in North Africa and the Ottoman Empire, throughout the Renaissance and early modern period. According to Robert Davis, from the 16th to 19th centuries, Barbary pirates captured 1 million to 1.25 million Europeans as slaves. These slaves were captured mainly from the crews of captured vessels, from coastal villages in Spain and Portugal, and from farther places like the Italian Peninsula, France, or England, the Netherlands, Ireland, the Azores Islands, and even Iceland.

For a long time, until the early 18th century, the Crimean Khanate maintained a massive slave trade with the Ottoman Empire and the Middle East. The Crimean Tatars frequently mounted raids into the Danubian principalities, Poland–Lithuania, and Russia to enslave people whom they could capture.

Eastern Europe

Hungary
The Böszörmény Muslims formed an early community of Muslims in Hungary. Their biggest settlement was near the town of present-day Orosháza in the central part of the Hungarian Kingdom. At that time this settlement entirely populated by Muslims was probably one of the biggest settlements of the Kingdom. This and several other Muslim settlements were all destroyed and their inhabitants massacred during the 1241 Mongol invasion of Hungary.

Russia and Ukraine

In the mid-7th century AD, following the Muslim conquest of Persia, Islam spread into areas that would later become part of Russia. There are accounts of the trade connections between Muslims and the Rus', apparently people from the Baltic region who made their way towards the Black Sea through Central Russia. During his journey to Volga Bulgaria in 921–922, Ibn Fadlan observed the Rus', claiming that some had converted to Islam. "They are very fond of pork and many of them who have assumed the path of Islam miss it very much." The Rus' also relished their nabidh, a fermented drink which Ibn Fadlan often mentioned as part of their daily fare.

The Mongols began their conquest of Rus', of Volga Bulgaria, and of the Cuman-Kipchak Confederation (parts of present-day Russia and Ukraine) in the 13th century. After the Mongol empire split, the eastern European section became known as the Golden Horde. Although not originally Muslim, the western Mongols adopted Islam as their religion in the early-14th century under Berke Khan, and later Uzbeg Khan established it as the official religion of the state. Much of the mostly Turkic-speaking population of the Horde, as well as the small Mongol aristocracy, became Islamized (if they were not already Muslim, like the Volga Bulgars) and became known to Russians and Europeans as the Tatars. More than half
of the European portion of what is now Russia and Ukraine came under the suzerainty of Muslim Tatars and Turks from the 13th to the 15th centuries. The Crimean Khanate became a vassal state of the Ottoman Empire in 1475 and subjugated what remained of the Great Horde by 1502. The Russian Tsar Ivan the Terrible conquered the Muslim Khanate of Kazan in 1552.

Belarus and Poland–Lithuania
Lipka Tatar Muslims of Belarus and Poland–Lithuania. The material of their Mosques is wood.

Balkans

Seljuks
As a result of Babai revolt, in 1261, one of the Turkoman dervish Sari Saltuk was forced to take refuge in the Byzantine Empire, alongside 40 Turkoman clans. He was settled in Dobruja, whence he entered the service of the powerful Muslim Mongol emir, Nogai Khan. Sari Saltuk became the hero of an epic, as a dervish and ghazi spreading Islam into Europe.

Ottomans

The Ottoman Empire began its expansion into Europe by taking the European portions of the Byzantine Empire in the 14th and 15th centuries up until the 1453 capture of Constantinople, establishing Islam as the state religion in the region. The Ottoman Empire continued to stretch northwards, taking Hungary in the 16th century, and reaching as far north as the Podolia in the mid-17th century (Peace of Buczacz), by which time most of the Balkans was under Ottoman control. Ottoman expansion in Europe ended with their defeat in the Great Turkish War. In the Treaty of Karlowitz (1699), the Ottoman Empire lost most of its conquests in Central Europe. The Crimean Khanate was later annexed by Russia in 1783. Over the centuries, the Ottoman Empire gradually lost almost all of its European territories, until its collapse in 1922, when the former empire was transformed into the nation of Turkey.

Between 1354 (when the Ottomans crossed into Europe at Gallipoli) and 1526, the Empire had conquered the territory of present-day Greece, Bulgaria, Romania, Albania, Kosovo, Serbia, North Macedonia, Montenegro, Bosnia, and Hungary. The Empire laid siege to Vienna in 1683. The intervention of the Polish King broke the siege, and from then afterwards the Ottomans battled the Habsburg Emperors until 1699, when the Treaty of Karlowitz forced them to surrender Hungary and portions of present-day Croatia, Slovenia, and Serbia. From 1699 to 1913, wars and insurrections pushed the Ottoman Empire further back until it reached the current European border of present-day Turkey.

For most of this period, the Ottoman retreats were accompanied by Muslim refugees from these provinces (in almost all cases converts from the previous subject populations), leaving few Muslim inhabitants in Hungary and Croatia. Bulgaria remained under Ottoman rule until around 1878, and currently its population includes about 131,000 Muslims (2001 Census) (see Pomaks).

Bosnia was conquered by the Ottomans in 1463, and a large portion of the population converted to Islam in the first 200 years of Ottoman domination. By the time Austria-Hungary occupied Bosnia in 1878, the Habsburgs had shed the desire to re-Christianize new provinces. As a result, a sizable Muslim population in Bosnia survived into the 20th century. Albania and the Kosovo area remained under Ottoman rule until 1913. Prior to the Ottoman conquest, the northern Albanians were Roman Catholic and the southern Albanians were Christian Orthodox, but by 1913 the majority were Muslim.

Conversion to Islam

Apart from the effect of a lengthy period under Ottoman domination, many of the subject population were periodically and forcefully converted to Islam as a result of a deliberate move by the Ottomans as part of a policy of ensuring the loyalty of the population against a potential Venetian invasion. However, Islam was spread by force in the areas under the control of the Ottoman Sultan through devşirme and jizya. Rather Arnold explains Islam's spread by quoting 17th-century author Johannes Scheffler who stated:

Cultural influences

Islam piqued interest among European scholars, setting off the movement of Orientalism. The founder of modern Islamic studies in Europe was Ignác Goldziher, who began studying Islam in the late 19th century. For instance, Sir Richard Francis Burton, 19th-century English explorer, scholar, and orientalist, and translator of The Book of One Thousand and One Nights, disguised himself as a Pashtun and visited both Medina and Mecca during the Hajj, as described in his book A Personal Narrative of a Pilgrimage to Al-Medinah and Meccah.

Islamic architecture influenced European architecture in various ways (for example, the Türkischer Tempel synagogue in Vienna). During the 12th-century Renaissance in Europe, Latin translations of Arabic texts were introduced.

Twentieth century
Muslim emigration to metropolitan France surged during the Algerian War of Independence. In 1961, the West German Government invited first Gastarbeiters and similar contracts were offered by Switzerland; some of these migrant workers came from majority-Muslim countries such as Turkey. Migrants came to Britain from its majority-Muslim former colonies Pakistan and Bangladesh.

Current demographics

The exact number of Muslims in Europe is unknown but according to estimates by the Pew Forum, the total number of Muslims in Europe (excluding Turkey) in 2010 was about 44 million (6% of the total population), including 19 million (3.8% of the population) in the European Union. A 2010 Pew Research Center study reported that 2.7% of the world's Muslim population live in Europe.

Turkish people form the largest ethnic group in the European part of Turkey (as well as the Republic of Turkey as a whole) and Northern Cyprus. They also form centuries-old minority groups in other post-Ottoman nation states within the Balkans (i.e. the Balkan Turks), where they form the largest ethnic minority in Bulgaria and the second-largest minority in North Macedonia. Meanwhile, in the diaspora, the Turks form the largest ethnic minority group in Austria, Denmark, Germany, and the Netherlands. In 1997, there was approximately 10 million Turks living in Western Europe and the Balkans (i.e. excluding Northern Cyprus and Turkey). By 2010, up to 15 million Turks were living in the European Union (i.e. excluding Turkey and several Balkan and Eastern European countries which are not in the EU). According to sociologist Araks Pashayan 10 million "Euro-Turks" alone were living in Germany, France, the Netherlands, and Belgium in 2012. In addition, substantial Turkish communities have been formed in the United Kingdom, Austria, Sweden, Switzerland, Denmark, Italy, Liechtenstein, Finland, and Spain. Meanwhile, there are over one million Turks still living in the Balkans (especially in Bulgaria, Greece, Kosovo, North Macedonia, and Dobruja), and approximately 400,000 Meskhetian Turks in the Eastern European regions of the Post-Soviet states (i.e. Azerbaijan, Georgia, Kazakhstan, Russia, and Ukraine).

Estimates of the percentage of Muslims in Russia (the biggest group of Muslims in Europe) vary from 5 to 11.7%, depending on sources. It also depends on if only observant Muslims or all people of Muslim descent are counted. The city of Moscow is home to an estimated 1.5 million Muslims.

58.8% of the population in Albania adheres to Islam, making it the largest religion in the country. The majority of Albanian Muslims are secular Sunnīs with a significant Bektashi Shīʿa minority. The percentage of Muslims is 93.5% in Kosovo, 39.3% in North Macedonia (according to the 2002 Census, 46.5% of the children aged 0–4 were Muslim in Macedonia) and 50.7% in Bosnia and Herzegovina. In transcontinental countries such as Turkey and Azerbaijan, 99% and 93% of the populations from the respective countries are initially registered by the state as Muslims. According to the 2011 census, 20% of the total population in Montenegro are Muslims.

"Non-denominational Muslims" is an umbrella term that has been used for and by Muslims who do not belong to a specific Islamic denomination, do not self-identify with any specific Islamic denomination, or cannot be readily classified under one of the identifiable Islamic schools and branches. A quarter of the world's Muslim population are non-denominational Muslims. Non-denominational Muslims constitute the majority of the Muslim population in eight countries, and a plurality in three others: Albania (65%), Kyrgyzstan (64%), Kosovo (58%), Indonesia (56%), Mali (55%), Bosnia and Herzegovina (54%), Uzbekistan (54%), Azerbaijan (45%), Russia (45%), and Nigeria (42%). They are found primarily in Central Asia. Kazakhstan has the largest number of non-denominational Muslims, who constitute about 74% of the population. Southeastern Europe also has a large number of non-denominational Muslims.

In 2015, Darren E. Sherkat questioned in Foreign Affairs whether some of the Muslim growth projections are accurate as they don't take into account the increasing number of non-religious Muslims. Quantitative research is lacking, but he believes the European trend mirrors that from North America: statistical data from the General Social Survey in the United States show that 32% of those raised Muslim no longer embrace Islam in adulthood, and 18% hold no religious identification (see also: Ex-Muslims).

A survey conducted by Pew Research Center in 2016 found that Muslims make up 4.9% of all Europe's population. According to the same study, conversion does not add significantly to the growth of the Muslim population in Europe, with roughly 160,000 more people leaving Islam than converting into Islam between 2010 and 2016.

Projections

A Pew Research Center study, published in January 2011, forecast an increase of Muslims in European population from 6% in 2010 to 8% in 2030. The study also predicted that Muslim fertility rate in Europe would drop from 2.2 in 2010 to 2.0 in 2030. On the other hand, the non-Muslim fertility rate in Europe would increase from 1.5 in 2010 to 1.6 in 2030. Another Pew study published in 2017 projected that in 2050 Muslims will make 7.4% (if all migration into Europe were to immediately and permanently stop - a "zero migration" scenario) up to 14% (under a "high" migration scenario) of Europe's population. Data from the 2000s for the rates of growth of Islam in Europe showed that the growing number of Muslims was due primarily to immigration and higher birth rates.

In 2017, Pew projected that the Muslim population of Europe would reach a level between 7% and 14% by 2050. The projections depend on the level of migration. With no net migration, the projected level was 7%; with high migration, it was 14%. The projections varied greatly by country. Under the high migration scenario, the highest projected level of any historically non-Muslim country was 30% in Sweden. By contrast, Poland was projected to remain below 1%.

In 2006, the conservative Christian historian Philip Jenkins, in an article for the Foreign Policy Research Institute thinktank, wrote that by 2100, a Muslim population of about 25% of Europe's population was "probable"; Jenkins stated this figure did not take account of growing birthrates amongst Europe's immigrant Christians, but did not give details of his methodology. in 2010, Eric Kaufmann, professor of politics at Birkbeck, University of London said that "In our projections for Western Europe by 2050 we are looking at a range of 10-15 per cent Muslim population for most of the high immigration countries – Germany, France, the UK"; he argued that Islam was expanding, not because of conversion to Islam, but primarily due to the religion's "pro-natal" orientation, where Muslims tend to have more children. Other analysts are skeptical about the accuracy of the claimed Muslim population growth, stating that because many European countries do not ask a person's religion on official forms or in censuses, it has been difficult to obtain accurate estimates, and arguing that there has been a decrease in Muslim fertility rates in Morocco, the Netherlands, and Turkey.

Religiosity 
According to an article published on the German public broadcaster Deutsche Welle, communities of Muslim immigrants remain strongly religious in some Western-European countries, in a trend which continues across generations. In the United Kingdom, 64% identify as "highly religious", followed by 42% in Austria, 33% in France, and 26% in Switzerland.

A 2005 survey published by the Université Libre de Bruxelles estimated that only 10% of the Muslim population in Belgium are "practicing Muslims". In 2009, only 24% of Muslims in the Netherlands attended mosque once a week according to another survey. 

According to the same 2004 survey, they found that the importance of Islam in the lives of Dutch Muslims, particularly of second-generation immigrants was decreasing. According to a survey, only 33% of French Muslims who were interviewed said they were religious believers. That figure is the same as that obtained by the INED/INSEE survey in October 2010.

Society

Islamic organizations

Mosques

Islamic dress

According to Pew Research Center in 2018, most Europeans favour restrictions on face-covering veils. An estimated 13 out of 15 favoring a ban of face-covering veils in Western Europe. As opposed to politicians and intellectuals, people perceive Islamic dress to not represent religious symbols but a repressive ideology in the form of Islamism which intends to extend its influence into family, society and politics.

Honor killings 

According to a study investigating 67 honor killings in Europe 1989-2009 by psychologist Phyllis Chesler, published in the non-peer reviewed Middle East Quarterly journal, 96% of honor murder perpetrators in Europe were Muslim and 68% of victims were tortured before they died. According to her study, Muslim girls and women are murdered for honor in both the Western world and elsewhere for refusing to wear the hijab or for not wearing it strictly. Allegations of unacceptable "Westernization" of a Muslim woman accounted for 71% of the justifications of honor killings in Europe.

Islamism

Islamic fundamentalism and terrorism 

A 2013 study conducted by Wissenschaftszentrum Berlin für Sozialforschung (WZB) found that Islamic fundamentalism was widespread among Muslims in Europe. The study conducted a poll among Turkish immgrants to six European countries: Germany, France, the Netherlands, Belgium, Austria, and Sweden. In the first four countries also Moroccan immigrants were interviewed. Fundamentalism was defined as: the belief that believers should return to the eternal and unchangeable rules laid down in the past; that these rules allow only one interpretation and are binding for all believers; and that religious rules have priority over secular laws. Two thirds of Muslims the majority responded that religious rules are more important than civil laws and three quarters rejecting religious pluralism within Islam. Of the respondents, 44% agreed to all three statements. Almost 60% responded that Muslims should return to the roots of Islam, 75% thought there was only one possible interpretation of the Quran.

The conclusion was that religious fundamentalism is much more prevalent among European Muslims than among Christian natives. Perceived discrimination is a marginal predictor of religious fundamentalism. The perception that Western governments are inherently hostile towards Islam as a source of identity is prevailing among some European Muslims. However, a recent study shows that this perception significantly declined after the emergence of ISIS, particularly among the youth, and highly educated European Muslims. The difference between countries defies a "reactive religious fundamentalism", where fundamentalism is viewed as a reaction against lacking rights and privileges for Muslims. Instead, it was found that Belgium which has comparatively generous policies towards Muslims and immigrants in general also had a relatively high level of fundamentalism. France and Germany which have restrictive policies had lower levels of fundamentalism.

In 2017, the EU Counter-terrorism Coordinator Gilles de Kerchove stated in an interview that there were more than  radicals and jihadists in Europe. In 2016, French authorities stated that  of the  individuals on the list of security threats belong to Islamist movements. In the United Kingdom, authorities estimate that  jihadists reside in the country, of which about 3000 are actively monitored. In 2017, German authorities estimated that there were more than  militant salafists in the country. European Muslims have also been criticized for new antisemitism.

Attitudes towards Muslims
  
The extent of negative attitudes towards Muslims varies across different parts of Europe.

The European Monitoring Centre on Racism and Xenophobia reports that the Muslim population tends to suffer Islamophobia all over Europe, although the perceptions and views of Muslims may vary.

In 2005 according to the Sociaal en Cultureel Planbureau annual report, half the Dutch population and half the Moroccan and Turkish minorities stated that the Western lifestyle cannot be reconciled with that of Muslims.

A 2015 poll by the Polish Centre for Public Opinion Research found that 44% of Poles have a negative attitude towards Muslims, with only 23% having a positive attitude towards them. Furthermore, a majority agreed with statements like "Muslims are intolerant of customs and values other than their own." (64% agreed, 12% disagreed), "Muslims living in Western European countries generally do not acquire customs and values that are characteristic for the majority of the population of that country." (63% agreed, 14% disagreed), "Islam encourages violence more than other religions." (51% agreed, 24% disagreed).

A February 2017 poll of 10,000 people in 10 European countries by Chatham House found on average a majority were opposed to further Muslim immigration, with opposition especially pronounced in Austria, Poland, Hungary, France and Belgium. Of the respondents, 55% were opposed, 20% offered no opinion and 25% were in favour of further immigration from Muslim-majority countries. The authors of the study add that these countries, except Poland, had in the preceding years suffered jihadist terror attacks or been at the centre of a refugee crisis.  They also mention that in most of the polled countries the radical right has political influence.

According to a study in 2018 by Leipzig University, 56% of Germans sometimes thought the many Muslims made them feel like strangers in their own country, up from 43% in 2014. In 2018, 44% thought immigration by Muslims should be banned, up from 37% in 2014.

Based off U.S. State Department records in 2013, there were about 226 Anti-Muslim attacks in France, which was more than an 11% increase from the year previous. Examples of the attacks included a bomb in an Arab restaurant, and grenades thrown at mosques. In more recent years, the aftermath of terrorist attacks in France have led to huge amounts of anti-Islamic rhetoric and increasing amounts of hate crimes. The French government has also acted upon the Muslim population of France in recent years, with the lower house passing an anti-radicalism bill and increasing checks in places of worship.

Employment 
According to a WZB report investigating Muslims in Germany, France, the Netherlands, United Kingdom, Belgium and Switzerland, Muslims in Europe generally have higher levels of unemployment which is to a great part caused by the lack of language skills, the lack of inter-ethnic social ties and a traditional view of gender roles where women are not to work outside the home. Discrimination from employers caused a small part of the unemployment.

See also

 A Common Word Between Us and You
 Antemurale Christianitatis
 Early Muslim conquests
 History of Islam
 Islam and other religions
 Islam by country
 Islamic culture
 Islamic dress in Europe
 Islamic extremism
 Islamic feminism
 Islamic fundamentalism
 Islamic terrorism
 Islamic terrorism in Europe
 Islamism
 Islamophobia
 Islamophobic incidents
 List of cities in the European Union by Muslim population
 List of mosques in Europe
 Ottoman wars in Europe
 Persecution of Muslims
 Turks in Europe
 Catholic–Muslim Forum
 European Council for Fatwa and Research
 Muslim Council for Cooperation in Europe

References

Bibliography

 Franke, Patrick, Islam: State and Religion in Modern Europe, EGO - European History Online, Mainz: Institute of European History, 2016, retrieved: March 8, 2021 (pdf).

Further reading

 König, Daniel G., Arabic-Islamic Views of the Latin West. Tracing the Emergence of Medieval Europe, Oxford, OUP, 2015.

 Hamza, Gabor, Zur Rolle des Islam in der Geschichte des ungarischen Rechts. Revista Europea de Historia de las Ideas Políticas y de las Instituciones Públicas (REHIPIP) Número 3 - Junio 2012 1-11.pp. http://www.eumed.net/rev/rehipip/03/gh.pdf

External links
 For Muslim Minorities, it is Possible to Endorse Political Liberalism, But This is not Enough
 BBC News: Muslims in Europe
 
 Euro-Islam Website Coordinator Jocelyne Cesari, Harvard University and CNRS-GSRL, Paris

 Asabiyya: Re-Interpreting Value Change in Globalized Societies
 Why Europe has to offer a better deal towards its Muslim communities. A quantitative analysis of open international data
 Köchler, Hans, Muslim-Christian Ties in Europe: Past, Present and Future, 1996
 

 
Religion in Europe